Stochastic Processes and Their Applications is a monthly peer-reviewed scientific journal published by Elsevier for the Bernoulli Society for Mathematical Statistics and Probability. The editor-in-chief is Sylvie Méléard. The principal focus of this journal is theory and applications of stochastic processes. It was established in 1973.

Abstracting and indexing 
The journal is abstracted and indexed in:

According to the Journal Citation Reports, Stochastic Processes and Their Applications has a 2020 impact factor of 1.467.

References 

Probability journals
Elsevier academic journals
English-language journals
Monthly journals
Publications established in 1973